The men's triathlon was part of the Triathlon at the 2000 Summer Olympics programme. It was the first appearance of the event, making this an official debut at the 2000 Summer Olympics. The competition was held on Sunday, September 17, 2000 at the Sydney Opera House in Sydney.

Competition format
The race was held over the "international distance" (also called "Olympic distance") and consisted of  swimming, road bicycle racing, and  road running.

Results
52 athletes competed in men's triathlon; only four of them dropped out of the cycling phase.

* Including Transition 1 (swimming-to-cycling) and T2 (cycling-to-running), roughly a minute. 
No one is allotted the number 13.
LAP - Lapped by the leader on the cycling course.

References

External links
Official Olympic Report
Official Results – Triathlon

Triathlon at the 2000 Summer Olympics
Olympics
Men's events at the 2000 Summer Olympics